The Pontotoc County Courthouse is a historic courthouse in Ada, Oklahoma. The building has been listed on the National Register of Historic Places since 1984. The county built the structure in 1926. In 2011, the courthouse underwent extensive remodeling.

References

Courthouses on the National Register of Historic Places in Oklahoma
Government buildings completed in 1926
Ada, Oklahoma
Buildings and structures in Pontotoc County, Oklahoma
County courthouses in Oklahoma
National Register of Historic Places in Pontotoc County, Oklahoma